St Mark's School is a public co-educational school in Mbabane, Eswatini. It was founded in 1908 by Reverend (later Bishop) Christopher Charles Watts of the Anglican Diocese of Swaziland.

Notable alumni

Notable St Mark's students include: 
Patrice Motsepe, businessman and sports executive (African Rainbow Minerals, Harmony Gold), president of the Chambers of Commerce and Industry South Africa (CHAMSA)
Phuthuma Nhleko, group chief executive officer of MTN telecommunications group
Richard E. Grant, British actor and director

References

External links
 St Marks Alumni 
 Old Marcians

Educational institutions established in 1908
Schools in Eswatini
Buildings and structures in Mbabane
1908 establishments in Swaziland